The women's 1500 metres at the 2019 Asian Athletics Championships was held on 24 April.

Results

References

1500
1500 metres at the Asian Athletics Championships
2019 in women's athletics